Anwaar Ahmad (born 11 June 1947, Multan) is an Urdu short story writer, scholar and academician from Pakistan. Presently, he is serving as the Director General at University of Gujrat's Sialkot Campus.He has been associated with Bahauddin Zakariya University, Multan, and Government College University, Faisalabad as a teacher, researcher, and departmental head (Urdu) for over 35 years. He has also served as a visiting professor at Ankara University in Ankara, Turkey and the Urdu department at Osaka University of Foreign Studies in Osaka, Japan.

He worked as the chairman of the National Language Authority from 17 June 2011 to 12 December 2012. He received the Best Teacher Award from the Higher Education Commission in 2000, and Presidential Pride of Performance in 2009, one of the highest literary awards from the Government of Pakistan.

He has authored and edited nineteen books. He has also published eight research papers in national and international journals of research. His book Urdu Afsana: Aik Sadi Ka Qissa has been acclaimed by Urdu scholars and researchers throughout Pakistan.

He is the 2010 recipient of the Saadi Literary Award.

Education
Anwaar Ahmad obtained his early education from the Muslim Boys High School in Multan, Pakistan. He earned his Masters (Urdu) degree from Punjab University, Lahore, Pakistan in 1969. He then went on to obtain his PhD from Bahauddin Zakariya University in 1985. His dissertation was titled  Urdu Short Story in its Socio-Political Perspective.

Career
After obtaining his master's degree in Urdu, Anwaar Ahmad served the Education Department of the Government of Punjab and Government of Balochistan for six years. In 1975, he joined Bahauddin Zakariya University, Multan as a lecturer in the Department of Urdu. He served the same institution as chairman of the Department of Urdu, chairman of the Department of Seraiki and dean of the Faculty of Languages and Islamic Studies until his retirement in 2007.

He was sent as a delegate by the Government of Pakistan to Ankara University, Turkey for a period of four years (1995–1999). He was associated with the department of Urdu and Pakistan studies.

After his retirement in 2007, he was appointed the chairman of the department of Urdu and dean of the Faculty of Oriental Studies at Government College University, Faisalabad. In 2009, he proceeded to Osaka University in Osaka, Japan as a visiting associate professor.

On 17 June 2011, he was appointed as the chairman of the National Language Authority by the prime minister of Pakistan on the recommendation of the chairman search committee (Cabinet Division, Pakistan). He retired from the post on 12 December 2012.Has been writing Urdu columns titled 'Wada Khilafi' in the Urdu daily Dunya News. He also writes for the Pakistani socio-political website Top Story Online.

He served as the Director General at University of Gujrat's Sialkot sub-campus for a period of two years (2013–2015). Presently, he is associated with Bahauddin Zakariya University as a Visiting Professor at Department of Urdu.

References
Interview with Dr. Anwaar Ahmad, The News, Pakistan (2010).
Book Review – Urdu Afsana – Aik Saadi ka Qissa, The News, Pakistan (2007).
Anwaar Ahmad's Columns – Wada Khilafi, DUNYA NEWS NETWORK (2013).
Anwaar Ahmad's Columns – TOP STORY ONLINE (2013),
Anwaar Ahmad – HEC Approved Supervisor.

1947 births
Living people
Bahauddin Zakariya University alumni
Academic staff of Bahauddin Zakariya University
Academic staff of the Government College University Faisalabad
Pakistani educational theorists
Pakistani male short story writers
Pakistani short story writers
People from Multan
Recipients of the Pride of Performance
University of the Punjab alumni
Academic staff of the University of the Punjab
Recipients of the Saadi Literary Award
Punjabi people
People related to Persian literature
Academic staff of Osaka University